is a Japanese female BMX rider, representing her nation at international competitions. She competed in the time trial event and race event at the 2015 UCI BMX World Championships.

References

External links
 
 

1996 births
Living people
BMX riders
Japanese female cyclists
Place of birth missing (living people)
20th-century Japanese women
21st-century Japanese women